Posht Kabud-e Jahangirvand (also Romanized as Posht Kabūd-e Jahāngīrvand; also known as Posht Kabūd) is a village in Osmanvand Rural District, Firuzabad District, Kermanshah County, Kermanshah Province, Iran. At the 2006 census, its population was 185, in 38 families.

References 

Populated places in Kermanshah County